Psilostomatidae is a family of trematodes in the order Plagiorchiida. They parasitise aquatic vertebrates as definitive hosts.

The genera placed here are:
 Astacatrematula Macy & Bell, 1968
 Gyrosoma Bryd, Bogitsh, Maples, 1961
 Mesaulus Braun, 1902
 Pseudopsilostoma Yamaguti, 1958
 Psilochasmus Luhe, 1909
 Psilostomum Looss, 1899
 Psilotornus Byrd & Prestwood, 1969
 Ribeiroia Travassos, 1939
 Sphaeridiotrema Odhner, 1913
 Stephanoproraoides Price, 1934

References

 
Animal parasites of vertebrates
Trematode families